Geminiani is an Italian surname. Notable people with the surname include:

Francesco Geminiani (1687–1762), Italian violinist, composer and music theorist
Sante Geminiani (1919–1951), Italian motorcycle racer

See also
Raphaël Géminiani (born 1925), French cyclist

Italian-language surnames